Katherine Demuth is an American professor of linguistics and the director of the Child Language Lab at Macquarie University. She was elected a Fellow of the Royal Society of New South Wales in February 2018, and is a Fellow of the Academy of Social Sciences in Australia (FSSA).

Education and career
She earned a BA from University of New Mexico, and an MA and Ph.D. from Indiana University.

Her early works included work on Bantu languages. At Macquarie University's Child Language Laboratory she and her team study language acquisition and development in children (including the hearing impaired, Mandarin-speaking children, those with mothers suffering depression, and indigenous children) and continue her work on child language acquisition from Brown University.

References

External links
Child Language Lab at Brown: Research in language acquisition
Child Language Lab at Brown: Research in Bantu languages

Living people
21st-century linguists
Fellows of the Royal Society of New South Wales
Fellows of the Academy of the Social Sciences in Australia
University of New Mexico alumni
Indiana University alumni
Brown University faculty
Academic staff of Macquarie University
Women linguists
Year of birth missing (living people)